The Ağın Bridge,  Ağın (Karamağara) Bridge, ( or Ağın Karamağara Köprüsü) is a cable-stayed bridge spanning Lake Keban in Elazığ Province, Turkey. It was opened to traffic in 2015.

The construction of the bridge began in 2001. Due to alterations to the project, construction was delayed, but work resumed on January 10, 2012, and the opening took place on October 26, 2015. The bridge was built by the Mega Yapi company and the consultant was BOTEK Bosphorus Technical Consulting Corporation.

The bridge carries one lane of traffic in each direction. At its opening, the Ağın Bridge became Turkey's fourth longest one after the Bosphorus Bridge, and Fatih Sultan Mehmet Bridge, in Istanbul and the Nissibi Euphrates Bridge, in Adıyaman Province. The budgeted cost of the construction was given as  33.325 million.

Background
The historic bridge was dismantled, and its ashlar masonry was moved to the Elazığ Museum before the Keban Dam was completed and its reservoir created in 1974. For a period of about 40 years following the establishment of the reservoir, the town was disconnected from the provincial center, and was accessible only by ferry boats across the lake. The newly built bridge is also named the "Ağın (Karamağara) Bridge" in remembrance of the previous Roman bridge which no longer exists.

References

Road bridges in Turkey
Cable-stayed bridges in Turkey
2015 establishments in Turkey
Bridges completed in 2015
Buildings and structures in Elazığ Province
Transport in Elazığ Province